Graeme Mulcahy (born 2 June 1990) is an Irish hurler who plays as a left corner-forward for club side Kilmallock and at inter-county level with the Limerick senior hurling team.

Playing career

Kilmallock

Mulcahy joined the Kilmallock club at a young age and played in all grades at juvenile and underage levels, enjoying championship success in the minor and under-21 grades. He made his senior championship debut as a seventeen-year-old during the 2007 championship.

On 3 October 2010, Mulcahy lined out in his first Limerick Senior Championship final. He scored 1-01 from play in the 1-16 to 1-12 defeat of divisional side Emmets.

After surrendering their championship crown in 2011, Kilmallock reached the championship decider again on 7 October 2012. Mulcahy was held scoreless, however, his brother, Jake Mulcahy, scored a vital goal to secure a 1-15 to 0-15 victory over Adare.

On 19 October 2014, Mulcahy captained Kilmallock to a third championship victory following a 1-15 to 0-14 defeat of reigning champions Na Piarsaigh. He later won a Munster Championship medal, scoring six points from play, following a 1-32 to 3-18 extra-time defeat of Cratloe in the final. On 17 March 2015, Mulcahy captained Kilmallock in their 1-18 to 1-06 defeat by Ballyhale Shamrocks in the All-Ireland final at Croke Park.

Limerick

Minor and under-21

Mulcahy first played for Limerick at minor level. He made his first appearance for the team on 23 June 2007 in a 3-21 to 0-12 defeat by Tipperary in the Munster Championship. Mulcahy was eligible for the minor grade again in 2008, however, Limerick's season ended with a 0-23 to 0-11 defeat by Cork.

Mulcahy subsequently joined the Limerick under-21 hurling team. On 3 August 2011, he scored 2-01 from play when Limerick defeated Cork by 4-20 to 1-27 in the final of the Munster Championship.

Senior

On 15 February 2009, Mulcahy made his senior debut as a substitute in a National League defeat by Kilkenny at Nowlan Park. Later that season he made his first championship appearance in a 0-25 to 0-17 defeat by Waterford in the Munster Championship.

Mulcahy claimed his first silverware at senior level on 30 April 2011 when Limerick won the National League Division 2 title after a 4-12 to 2-13 defeat of Clare in the final at Cusack Park.

On 14 July 2013, Mulcahy was at right corner-forward in Limerick's 0-24 to 0-15 defeat of Cork in the Munster final. He ended the season by being nominated for an All-Star award.

On 19 August 2018, Mulcahy scored 1-02 from play when Limerick won their first All-Ireland title in 45 years after a 3-16 to 2-18 defeat of Galway in the final. Later that day he was named on The Sunday Game Team of the Year. Mulcahy ended the season by winning an All-Star Award.

On 31 March 2019, Mulcahy was selected at left corner-forward for Limerick's National League final meeting with Waterford at Croke Park. He collected a winners' medal after scoring three points from play in the 1-24 to 0-19 victory. On 30 June 2019, Mulcahy won his first Munster Championship medal in six years after scoring two points from full-forward in Limerick's 2-26 to 2-14 defeat of Tipperary in the final. He ended the year by receiving his second successive All-Star nomination.

Munster

Mulcahy was selected for the Munster inter-provincial team for the first time on 17 February 2013. He later won a Railway Cup medal following a 1-22 to 0-15 defeat of Connacht. Mulcahy was also selected for the Munster team in 2014.

Career statistics

Honours

University College Cork
Fitzgibbon Cup (1): 2009

Kilmallock
Munster Senior Club Hurling Championship (1): 2014 (c)
Limerick Senior Hurling Championship (4): 2010, 2012, 2014 (c), 2021

Limerick
All-Ireland Senior Hurling Championship (4): 2018, 2020, 2021, 2022
Munster Senior Hurling Championship (5): 2013, 2019, 2020, 2021, 2022
National Hurling League (2): 2019, 2020
Munster Under-21 Hurling Championship (1): 2011

Munster
Railway Cup (1): 2014

Awards
GAA GPA All Stars Awards (1): 2018
The Sunday Game Team of the Year (1): 2018

References

1990 births
Living people
Kilmallock hurlers
UCC hurlers
Limerick inter-county hurlers
Munster inter-provincial hurlers